Žydrūnas Savickas (born 28 April 1991) is a Lithuanian former racing cyclist. He rode at the 2014 and the 2015 UCI Road World Championships.

Major results

2013
 1st  Time trial, National Under-23 Road Championships
 3rd Overall Baltic Chain Tour
2014
 7th Overall Baltic Chain Tour
2015
 4th Minsk Cup
2017
 3rd Overall Tour de Guadeloupe
2018
 10th Overall Tour du Jura

References

External links

1991 births
Living people
Lithuanian male cyclists
Place of birth missing (living people)
European Games competitors for Lithuania
Cyclists at the 2015 European Games